Stoyan N. Karastoyanoff, AIA, was a minor American architect practicing in New York City in the early twentieth century. Little of his work is known and his career was severely affected and cut short by the Great Depression. He is best known as the architect of the current Holy Cross Armenian Apostolic Church (New York City). In the 1910s he practiced from 114 East 28th Street before moving uptown to 220 Audubon Avenue, Washington Heights, Manhattan, roughly following the concurrent migration of German immigrants there of whom many where his clients.

Works
1917: Bashein Garrage, 376 West 213TH Street, a single-storey brick garage for $20,000
1917: Arras Garage & Auto Supply Co, 4892-4 Broadway, single-storey brick storage & warehouse for $25,000.00
1925: Norwegian Free Mission Church Sunday School, 461 West 166TH Street, single-storey brick Sunday School with a rubberoid roof (bitumen?) for $15,000
1925-1926: The Evangelical Lutheran Church of our Savior, 578-580 West 187th Street, now the Holy Cross Armenian Apostolic Church (New York City) since 1929.

References	

American ecclesiastical architects
Architects of Lutheran churches
20th-century American architects
Architects from New York City
Year of birth missing
Year of death missing